The National U.S.–Arab Chamber of Commerce (NUSACC) established nearly 50 years ago, is America’s longest serving organization dedicated to U.S. - Arab business. In 2016, NUSACC received the 2016 President of the United States’ “E” Award for Export Service, While various chambers of commerce have won the “E” Award over the years, this is the first time in the 55-year history of the award that it went to a chamber that is dedicated to U.S. – Arab relations. This award, conferred by the President of the United States, is the highest recognition that any U.S. entity may receive for supporting export activity.

NUSACC is a non-partisan, non-profit organization that is registered under U.S. law as a 501-c-6 chamber of commerce.  The Chamber is an independent, membership-driven entity that is funded by its member companies and stakeholders.  NUSACC’s stakeholders include more than 40,000 companies, the vast majority of which are small and medium-sized enterprises (SMEs) based in the United States.

NUSACC is the only business entity in the United States that is officially recognized and authorized by the League of Arab States and the General Union of Arab Chambers of Commerce, Industry, and Agriculture.  As such, NUSACC is a “sister chamber” and partner to the national chambers of commerce throughout the Arab world.

On a daily basis, NUSACC works closely with government and private sector leaders throughout the Arab world, as well as high-level decision-makers in the U.S. business community, public policy research centers (“think tanks”), multilateral institutions, nongovernmental organizations (NGOs), media, and the U.S. Government.

References

Chambers of commerce